"More and More" is a song written by country singer/songwriter Merle Kilgore. Webb Pierce's 1954 recording of "More and More" spent ten weeks at number one on the country charts and  twenty-nine weeks on the chart overall. The song also crossed over and peaked at number 22 on the pop charts, making it the most successful pop single of Pierce's career. The B-side of "More and More", "You're Not Mine Anymore," peaked at number eight on the C&W Best Seller charts. The song was featured in the horror movie  The Hills Have Eyes during the opening credits.

Cover versions 
 Charley Pride covered the song in 1983, and reached #7 on Us Country and #3 on Canada Country.

References

1954 songs
1983 singles
Songs written by Merle Kilgore
Webb Pierce songs
Charley Pride songs
Decca Records singles
RCA Records singles